Shooting Star/Hang On For Your Life is the 1991 re-release of Shooting Star's first two albums, Shooting Star and Hang On for Your Life, on compact disc. The compilation was released by their own label after gaining the rights back. Two songs were deleted due to time constraints "Sweet Elatia" and "Stranger".

Track listing

Personnel
Van McLain – guitars, lead vocals
Gary West – lead vocals, guitars, keyboards
Bill Guffey – keyboards
Steve Thomas – drums
Ron Verlin – bass
Charles Waltz – violin, keyboards, vocals

References

Albums produced by Gus Dudgeon
Shooting Star (band) albums
1991 compilation albums